Branimir Petev Kostadinov (born 4 March 1989) is a Bulgarian footballer who currently plays as a forward for Ludogorets Razgrad II.

Career
Branimir's first club was Slavia Sofia, them moved to the youth squads of Austrian LASK Linz. In 2006 Kostadinov joined Heart of Midlothian as an amateur player. He was unable to play in competitive under-19 matches until his country joined the European Union.
In season 2007–08 he was part of the first team pre-season in Germany, where he scored his first senior goal for the club in a 2–1 defeat to BV Cloppenberg. After that, he played for Hearts U-19 in 2007–2008. In the next 2008–09 season Kostadinov played in reserve squad of Hearts never making the grade before being released without playing for the first team.

Chernomorets Burgas
After the end of 2008–09 season Kostadinov was released by Hearts along with many other players and returned to Bulgaria. He had been invited by Chernomorets Burgas to join trial period, which began on 2 June 2009.

On 15 June Kostadinov played for the reserve squad in a match against Vihren. He scored two goals and provided three assists in a 6–0 win.

A few days later, on 20 June, Kostadinov signed a three-year contract with Chernomorets Burgas. He will play in the satellite club of Chernomorets – Chernomorets Pomorie

1. FC Tatran Prešov
On 17 July 2012, Kostadinov moved to 1. FC Tatran Prešov on a half-season loan, with an option of making the transfer permanent in winter, from Botev Vratsa. He made his debut for 1. FC Tatran Prešov against FK Senica on 22 July 2012 and scored his only goal for the team on 4 August 2012, in the 2:0 win over MFK Ružomberok in a league match.

Lokomotiv Sofia

On 4 January 2013, after returning from his loan, he signed a 1,5-year contract with A PFG club Loko Sofia.

International career
Kostadinov was a part of the Bulgaria U19 at the 2008 European Under-19 Championship in Czech Republic.

References

External links

1989 births
Living people
Bulgarian footballers
Bulgaria youth international footballers
Bulgaria under-21 international footballers
First Professional Football League (Bulgaria) players
Heart of Midlothian F.C. players
PFC Chernomorets Burgas players
FC Pomorie players
FC Botev Vratsa players
1. FC Tatran Prešov players
Slovak Super Liga players
FC Lokomotiv 1929 Sofia players
PFC Lokomotiv Plovdiv players
FC Dunav Ruse players
Bulgarian expatriate footballers
Expatriate footballers in Scotland
Expatriate footballers in Slovakia
Bulgarian expatriate sportspeople in Slovakia
Bulgarian expatriate sportspeople in Scotland
Association football forwards
People from Veliko Tarnovo
Sportspeople from Veliko Tarnovo Province
PFC Ludogorets Razgrad II players
PFC Ludogorets Razgrad players